Fear Island is a 2009 Canadian mystery-thriller film directed by Michael Storey and starring Aaron Ashmore, Haylie Duff, Lucy Hale and Kyle Schmid. The film follows five student friends partying on a remote island, when they find a dead body and encounter a killer who wants them all dead.

Fear Island was released direct-to-video on September 8, 2009, in Canada and on June 28, 2010, in the United States.

Plot

The only survivor of an outing is brought to a police interrogation room, where the Detective angrily questions Jenna who says she can't remember what happened. The detective thinks she is the killer of six people. The story of what happened on the island is told through Jenna's flashbacks of memory. After the D.A. appoints a doctor to supervise her interrogation while in the hospital.

After three years together in college, a group of friends, Kyle, Tyler, Ashley, Jenna and Mark meet for a weekend getaway at brothers Kyle and Tyler's family cabin. Located on a secluded island, for one last party before they go their separate ways.

Minutes after arriving on the island, a stowaway, Megan, reveals herself. Soon after, the group gets down to partying, drinking, and fooling around. Ashley and Kyle are in the hot tub, while Tyler and Megan are inside doing Tequila shots. Jenna, upset that Mark tagged along at the last minute goes to the dock alone. Where Mark finds her to try and set up a truce. Meanwhile, someone is watching Tyler give Megan shots and then Tyler gives Ashley's little dog Tequila in a bowl. Tyler later lets the tipsy dog outside alone, and makes his move on Megan. Who is willing but says she hasn't done it before as she is only 15. Tyler changes his mind, apologizes and says he was mistaken to try and seduce her. Tyler goes outside to find Ashley and Kyle have discovered blood in their ice bucket and are freaking out.

The next day Ashley is looking for her dog when she finds a body—Keith's, with the word Evil written on his shirt. Tyler shares that Keith is not really the caretaker, but Tyler and Kyle's half-brother and they discover the boat is missing, the only way to leave the island. The guys go to take down Keith's body but it's missing, and the girls look for her dog. While they are split up, Ashley thinks she hears her dog in the hot tub and goes in to find him. The killer locks her in the tub and she boils to death. When the others meet up again, they find her body in the locked hot tub. They decide to put Ashley's body in the freezer and find walkie talkies that still work. When they return to the house they find a wind-up toy on the deck and the word Innocent written on the patio door.  They then hear something toward the woods. Kyle goes alone to check it out and steps in a bear trap. The others get him free of the trap and they take him back inside. Megan offers to stay with Kyle.

Meanwhile, as they settle down for the night, Tyler gets a nail gun for protection. Jenna gets a knife, and Mark has a bat. Jenna thinks she saw the killer outside but when they go out to check they don't see him. Tyler recommends they go inside to get some sleep. Through the night they wake up when the lights go out and discover Kyle has disappeared. Tyler goes out to the deck armed with his nail gun but a tree is set on fire. Causing him to stumble backward and drop the nailgun. Tyler scrambles back in the house and is told his brother Kyle is missing. Just then the killer begins to shoot nails from the nail gun and Tyler is hit. While they are taking the nails out of Tyler, they hear Kyle calling for help. Tyler wants to go but Mark holds him back.

The next day the four hear on a walkie talkie that Kyle is being tortured and realize the background noises are coming from the dock. They all run to the dock but only find the other walkie talkie. Kyle kept saying 'Atonement' over and over on the walkie when they heard him being tormented. Jenna writes down the words they've found written around the house and murders. Thinking they are an anagram, they make a few guesses, until Tyler says "Regina". Tyler tells Mark, Megan, and Jenna how he met a girl named Regina and brought her out to a party. When she got drunk, he slept with her and video-taped it. He said she had regrets, but insisted that she left.

They go to the caretaker's cabin and on the table is a mound of dirt and a play shovel. They ask Tyler what really happened. So he tells them that Regina had tried to leave his bed but he grabbed her arm. She was still drunk and she fell and hit her head, dying instantly. Tyler says he and Kyle buried her body on the other side of the island but no one else knew.  Now they wonder if she has come back from the dead, and demand Tyler dig up her body. But when he does he finds Kyle.

Meanwhile, Megan says that she isn't part of this and runs back to the house. There she calls the others with the walkie talkie, that the killer is after her and that it's Keith. Tyler runs to the house trying to find the killer, but a snake hidden in a kitchen cabinet bites him in the chest. Jenna and Mark try to help him, but the venom takes effect quickly and he dies in front of them. Feeling helpless, Jenna confesses that she remembers seeing Tyler with Regina and Kyle joining the two in bed. She says she could have stopped them while Regina was drunk, but she didn't.

Mark and Jenna search the house for Megan and think they've found her. But the wrapped up body turns out to be Regina's dug up body. Suddenly they run into Keith in the house, who grabs Jenna hostage with a knife. He is the killer. Keith reveals that he knew about what Kyle and Tyler did to Regina and that he watched them bury Regina.  Mark and Keith battle. They fall together off the balcony but Mark breaks his neck.

Keith chases Jenna through the woods until she is caught in a snare trap. He is about to kill her when Megan arrives. She hits him with a shovel and kills him, saving Jenna. The two girls run to the boat (which is now at the dock). Megan wonders how their friends' parents or siblings will react. Jenna asks Megan if she has any siblings. She quietly answers that she had a sister and Jenna realizes that Megan is Regina's sister. Megan pulls out the knife she used to cut Jenna down from the snare trap.

The scene cuts back to the hospital where Jenna has been telling her story to the detective and doctor. And declares she killed Megan in self-defense. The detective apologizes for accusing her of murder and Jenna leaves to her room with the doctor. The doctor begins to ask Jenna about the oddities of her story, while drinking a glass of soda Jenna gave her to celebrate her memory returning. But the soda is drugged with the sleeping pills that Jenna was stashing during her day at the hospital.

Meanwhile, Jenna's parents come into the interview room and see the picture of Megan on the board. They ask why their daughter's picture is displayed there. The detective is confused. And the parents identify who he thought was a picture of Regina's sister Megan as their daughter Jenna. The Detective realizes that Jenna lied and that she (Duff) is indeed actually Megan, Regina's sister. During the retelling of the story, Megan had switched her name with that of Jenna (Hale) in the flashbacks. Which represented the story as she had been telling it, revealing Megan is the killer. When she tried to leave the island and was arrested by the police without question. The detective races to Megan's hospital room to find the doctor in the bed, alive but unconscious.

Meanwhile, Megan dressed as the female doctor wearing sunglasses escapes the hospital using the doctor's car. She is last seen leaving the doctor's car on the side of a road and flagging down a stranger's car and introducing herself.

Cast

 Aaron Ashmore as Mark
 Haylie Duff as Megan Anderson (Jenna)
 Lucy Hale as Jenna Campbell (Megan)
 Kyle Schmid as Tyler Campbell
 Anne Marie DeLuise as Dr. Chalice
 Martin Cummins as Detective Armory
 Jacob Blair as Kyle Campbell
 Jessica Harmon as Ashley
 Jim Thorburn as Keith
 Brenna O'Brien as Regina Anderson
 Keith Martin Gordey as Mr. Campbell
 Patricia Harras as Mrs. Campbell

References

External links
 
 

English-language Canadian films
2009 horror films
Teen mystery films
2009 films
Canadian horror thriller films
Films shot in Vancouver
2000s English-language films
2000s Canadian films